Hali Murk is a populated place situated in Pima County, Arizona, United States. The name became official in 1941 through a decision of the Board on Geographic Names. It has also been known by Haal-Muihedak, Hardimui, Harle Muheta, Harlemuheta, Mesqual, and Mesquit.

References

Populated places in Pima County, Arizona